Knapstad Station is located at Knapstad in Hobøl, Norway on the Østfold Line. The railway station is served by the Oslo Commuter Rail line L22 from Oslo Central Station. The station was opened in 1912.

Railway stations in Østfold
Railway stations on the Østfold Line
Railway stations opened in 1912
1912 establishments in Norway
Hobøl